Gjon Markagjoni (28 August 1888 – 28 April 1966) was an Albanian Catholic clan chieftain.

Biography
He was born in Orosh, Mirdita, the only son of Kapidan Marka Gjoni (1861–1925). His father was the leader or Kapidan of Mirdita who rebelled against the Albanian government if favour of an independent Mirdita. In 1921 in an alliance with Esadists, Marka Gjoni founded the Republic of Mirdita in northern Albania and served as its president during its short existence. His republic did not receive recognition by its alleged citizens nor from other countries. Marka Gjoni's rebellion was extinguished by the Albanian government later that year. Marka Gjoni fled to Yugoslavia, but later returned to Albania and remained active in the political life of the highlands.

Gjon married Mrika Pervizi (1883-1969) in 1904, the niece of the Bajraktar of Kurbin, Gjok Pjeter Pervizi. They had ten children.

Succession as clan leader, 1925

After the death of his father, Kapidan Marka Gjoni in 1925, Kapidan Gjon inherited the responsibility handed down to him as leader of Mirdita. He was often called upon to intervene in feuds raging within other Mirdita tribes and to preside over the arguments with fairness and clarity, but most of all to pass on judgments following the guidelines of the Kanun.

Although young, at the age of 37 he was already distinguished as a leader of the mission. He was responsible for reconciling 620 blood feuds between 1926 and 1928, leading Mirdita to become one of the more peaceful regions of the North. Because of his leadership skills in mediating reconciliation, he became widely known and many activists and foreign leaders requested to meet him. In 1930 Kapidan Gjon went to Rome where he was received with high honours by the Italian Government and the Pope.

In a conversation with Zog, the then president of Albania, Kapidan Gjon presented his economic views on the poor state of Mirdita, getting a promise that the region would be exempt from any state tax. When Ahmet Zogu was proclaimed king in 1928, all the northern chiefs of the mountains, among them Kapidan Gjon, met with him, while Gjon was the first chief offered a meeting with the king.

In 1944, Kapidan Gjon, along with his sons, Mark, Ndue and Lesh, organized an anti-communist resistance. Thus, Kapidan Mark Gjomarkaj, with full support of his father Kapidan Gjon, founded the "National Independent Group" in Shkodra, which he developed through his own political activity.

Exile in Rome
Overpowered by the communists, he was forced to leave his Mirdita under the escort of his second eldest son Ndue. In Kastrat, on November 27, 1944, he gave farewell to his crew including his sons Mark and Llesh who would stay behind and continue the fight. Accompanied by his son Ndue, he was forced to leave behind his sons Mark and Llesh to continue the fight against the partisans. They both died in combat; Mark on 14 June 1946 and Llesh on 9 August 1947.

Gjon Marka Gjoni, collaborated with the Albanian publicist and writer Ernest Koliqi, in sketching a political organization in exile. This organization was named "Independent National Bloc", which was formed on 6 November 1946, in Rome.

Kapidan Gjon lived in Rome with his son Ndue, his daughter-in-law Maria Teresa and three granddaughters: Maria Cristina, Bianca Maria and Alessandra. He became seriously ill in 1960. He recovered and he was in relatively good health until 1964, when his illness returned. This illness would keep him hospitalized for two years. He died on 28 April 1966. He was buried in Rome on 30 April 1966. His funeral was attended by many dignitaries, scholars and friends. Telegrams and condolences were sent by Leka, Crown Prince of Albania, Cardinal Antoniutti and Francesco Jacomoni, among others.

See also
Albanian Subversion
Communism in Albania
Republic of Mirdita
Kryeziu Brothers
Bardhok Biba

References 

Albanian politicians
1888 births
1966 deaths
Albanian Roman Catholics
20th-century Albanian clergy
People from Mirditë
Albanian anti-communists
19th-century Albanian military personnel
20th-century Albanian military personnel
Albanians from the Ottoman Empire
Albanian resistance members
Albanian emigrants to Italy
Members of the Senate of the Kingdom of Italy